Francisco Pizarro was a 16th-century Spanish conquistador who conquered Peru.

Francisco Pizarro may also refer to:
Francisco Pizarro, Chilean footballer 
Francisco Pizarro Martínez, Mexican diplomat 
Francisco Pizarro, Nariño, municipality in the Nariño Department, Colombia

See also
Pizarro (disambiguation)